Bahlen is a place in Germany near Ludwigslust.  It is one of the town subdivisions (Ortsteile) of Boizenburg, a municipality in the district of Ludwigslust-Parchim, in Mecklenburg-Western Pomerania.

The nearest airport is Lübeck Airport.

History

References

Villages in Mecklenburg-Western Pomerania